Summit Air (8199400 Canada Inc.) is a Canadian airline headquartered in Yellowknife that operates scheduled, charter and cargo aviation throughout the Northwest Territories, Nunavut, and Yukon. Summit Air is a member of the Ledcor Group of Companies and operates in partnership with several other companies and communities including the Haisla Nation (Summit Kitamaat Aviation Limited Partnership), Air Baffin (Summit Air Baffin), the Det'on Cho Corporation (Det’on Cho Summit Aviation LP), and businesses in the Kitikmeot Region (Summit Air Kitikmeot). 

Summit's head office is in Yellowknife and they operate in most of Western Canada with bases in Terrace, Lillooet, and Kamloops in British Columbia, and Fort McMurray, Edmonton, and Calgary in Alberta. In the Northwest Territories, their bases include Yellowknife and Norman Wells. They also operate out of the United Kingdom for the Ministry of Defence and the Falcon Demonstration Team, a parachute team of the Royal Air Force.

History

Summit Air started in Atlin, British Columbia in 1987. In January 2001, the base of operations was moved to Yellowknife. The Ledcor Group of Companies became a partner on June 1, 2009. In August, 2012 Summit acquired Arctic Sunwest Charters and all aircraft operated by them were re-branded as Summit.

In January 2015, the airline acquired an Avro RJ85 jet aircraft which is being operated by Summit for Canadian North for use on services from Yellowknife and Edmonton. A second Avro RJ85 has since been ordered and Summit Air has now added larger Avro RJ100 jet aircraft as well.

Current fleet

As of November 2021, Summit Air has the following aircraft registered with Transport Canada:

Summit Air plane types

See also
 Summit Helicopters

References

External links

Summit Air official site
 Summit Air at Ledcor
Canadian Company Capabilities (CCC)

Charter airlines of Canada
Airlines established in 1987
Regional airlines of the Northwest Territories
Regional airlines of Nunavut
Regional airlines of Yukon
Companies based in Yellowknife
1987 establishments in British Columbia
Seaplane operators